Audubon International is a not for profit 501(c)(3) environmental education organization based in Troy, New York. Established in 1987, the organization works with communities, developments, resorts, and golf courses in 36 countries to plan and implement sustainable natural resource management practices, as well as receive public recognition (through certification processes) for employing sound environmental stewardship.

It is the first organization to work extensively with the golf industry on sustainability issues, and has a long history of partnering with industry associations such as the United States Golf Association (USGA). The organization has been recognized by the U.S. Environmental Protection Agency and other members of the environmental community for enabling facilities to adopt design and operations practices that are consistent with the principles of sustainability. Central to Audubon International's core value system is the belief that voluntary education and certification programs can simultaneously advance ecological, economic and social goals.

The organization is not affiliated with the National Audubon Society, which sued to prevent the organization from using the Audubon name. In 1991, a judge ruled that the National Audubon Society did not hold an exclusive right to the name Audubon, and had not shown that the use of the name by Audubon International was causing confusion.

Funding 
Audubon International is a membership organization and a 501(c)(3) not-for-profit. Most of the funding for the organization comes from golf courses, who each pay thousands of dollars to become certified, and hundreds of dollars per year for  membership. In addition, according to its online list of sponsors, the organization gets funds from turf, irrigation, and landscaping companies.

There is no additional fee for certification in any of Audubon International's programs, and membership fees include the ability to become certified, educational resources and staff guidance.

Programs
There are several programs in the organization that aim to educate members and non-members about the environment.

Environmental stewardship and management

Audubon Cooperative Sanctuary Program
This program focuses on helping companies and organizations learn about what they can do to help manage their surroundings that will in turn enhance their efficiency and conservation efforts.  Audubon International will focus on many things, including: Energy and Water Conservation, Waste Management, Wildlife and Habitat Management and Outreach and Education.

Some of the developments that have received this certification are:
 Bakery Feeds, Inc., Centre, Alabama
 Aurora Sports Park, Aurora, Colorado
 Amelia Island Plantation, Amelia Island, Florida
 Griffin Industries, Inc., Florida
 Kapalua Land Company, Hawaii

Audubon Cooperative Sanctuary Program for Golf
Similar to the Audubon Cooperative Sanctuary Program, this program works solely with golf courses and to help them create environmentally-friendly areas while still having functional spaces to play golf.  It also focuses on environmental planning, wildlife and habitat management, chemical use reduction and safety, water conservation, water quality management, and outreach and education.  The entire process can take 1 to 3 years to complete.

There are over 2,110 golf courses that participate in this program in 24 countries.

Some of the courses that have earned this certification are:
 Bob O'Connor Golf Course at Schenley Park.
 Shell Point Golf Club, Fort Myers, Florida
 Dwan Golf Club, Bloomington, Minnesota
 The Golf Club at Briar's Creek, Johns Island, South Carolina
 Ocean Winds Golf Course, The Town of Seabrook Island, South Carolina
 Crooked Oaks Golf Course, The Town of Seabrook Island, South Carolina
 The Greenbrier Resort, White Sulphur Springs, West Virginia
 Gull Lake View, Augusta, Michigan
 Lake Malaren Golf Club, Shanghai, China
 Prairie Dunes Country Club, Hutchinson, Kansas
 The River Club, Suwanee, Georgia
 Tuckahoe Creek Course of the Country Club of Virginia, Richmond, Virginia
 Victoria National Golf Course, Newburgh, Indiana
 Westfields Golf Club, Clifton, Virginia
 Wu Fong Golf Course, Taichung, Taiwan

Green Lodging Program
This program works with hotels to ensure that they are using green practices in their upkeep and everyday running of the establishment.  It helps with cost savings, conservation, cost avoidance, and the ability to increase market share.  It also awards one of four precious metal designations (bronze, silver, gold or platinum) as part of its eco-rating.

Some of the hotels that have earned this certification are:
 Hotel Sofitel Chicago Water Tower, Chicago, Illinois
 Resort, Cedar Grove Lodge, Huntsville, Ontario, Canada (4 Leaves)

Eco-design

Signature Program
This program works with new housing developments and helps them to create living areas that are environmentally sound. There are three levels to this program: gold, silver, and bronze, with gold being the top of the list.  After completing the program, a development can receive, among other things, certification as an Audubon International Sanctuary.

Some of the developments that have received this certification are:

 Evergrene, Palm Beach Gardens, Florida
 Black Forest at Lake James, Morganton, North Carolina
 Conserve School, Land O' Lakes, Wisconsin

Classic Program
This program is similar to Audubon Signature Programs, but it is for established developments that are either being redeveloped or restored or simply want to make their areas more environmentally friendly.  There are some minimum requirements and a development will not get certification until they pass a final audit.

Community planning and engagement

Sustainable Communities Program
This program works with communities to ensure that they are great places to live, work and play.  There are two different tracks: Public Sector and Private Sector.  The public sector is geared towards the local government while the private sector is more for properties run by an association, landlord or other such private entrepreneur.

Some of the communities that have received this certification are:
 Eufaula, Alabama

Other programs
In addition to these programs, Audubon International also participates in the following:
 Nestbox Network
 North American Birdwatching Open

References

External links
 Audubon International website

Articles:
 Up to the Challenge: The new Audubon International CEO is ready to take on the group's evolving mission
 Playing Golf in Friendly Confines
 Golf courses going green, getting Audubon certification

Audubon movement